Svėdasai is a town in Utena County in the northern part of Lithuania, bearing a name from a nearby Lake Svėdasas.

History
The name according to Kazimieras Būga is of Selonian origin.
In July 1941, 245 to 386 people were murdered in a mass execution near Svėdasai most must have been Jews.

Gallery

References 

Towns in Lithuania
Towns in Utena County
Vilkomirsky Uyezd
Holocaust locations in Lithuania
Anykščiai District Municipality